

Available channels (108)

Defunct channels (31)

Upcoming channels (17)

References

Lists of television channels in India
HD-only channels
India